Ulrich Herbert (born 24 September 1951) is a German historian and a specialist in the Nazi era and German history during World War II.

He was a professor at the University of Freiburg (Emeritus since fall 2019). In 1999 Herbert received the Gottfried Wilhelm Leibniz Prize in modern and contemporary history. He edited European history in the 20th Century, a series of ten surveys by German scholars.

Bibliography

.

References
 
 

1951 births
Living people
20th-century German historians
Gottfried Wilhelm Leibniz Prize winners
21st-century German historians
Academic staff of the University of Freiburg